Bound or bounds may refer to:

Mathematics
 Bound variable
 Upper and lower bounds, observed limits of mathematical functions

Physics
 Bound state, a particle that has a tendency to remain localized in one or more regions of space

Geography
Bound Brook (Raritan River), a tributary of the Raritan River in New Jersey
Bound Brook, New Jersey, a borough in Somerset County

People
Bound (surname)
Bounds (surname)

Arts, entertainment, and media

Films
 Bound (1996 film), an American neo-noir film by the Wachowskis
 Bound (2015 film), an American erotic thriller film by Jared Cohn
 Bound (2018 film), a Nigerian romantic drama film by Frank Rajah Arase

Television
 "Bound" (Fringe), an episode of Fringe
 "Bound" (The Secret Circle), an episode of The Secret Circle
 "Bound" (Star Trek: Enterprise), an episode of Star Trek: Enterprise

Other arts, entertainment, and media
 Bound (video game), a PlayStation 4 game
 "Bound", a song by Darkane from their 1999 album Rusted Angel
 "Bound", a song by Suzanne Vega from her 2007 album Beauty & Crime
 Bount or Bound, a fictional race in the anime Bleach

Other uses
Bound (car), a British 4-wheeled cyclecar made in 1920
 Legally bound, see Contract
Boundary (sports), the edges of a field
Butts and bounds, delineation of property bounds

See also
 Bind (disambiguation)
 Bond
 Bondage (disambiguation)
 Bound & Gagged (disambiguation)
 Boundary (disambiguation)